Daniel Rodríguez Pérez (born 27 March 1977 in San Sebastián, Gipuzkoa), known as Txiki, is a Spanish retired professional footballer who played as a left midfielder.

Career
Born in San Sebastián, Txiki began playing football with local sides before attracting notice with Segunda División B side Cultural y Deportiva Leonesa, in particular scoring the match-winning goal from a free-kick against Racing de Santander in the 2001–02 Copa del Rey. Shortly after, during the winter break of the 2001–02 Segunda División season, Racing  manager Quique Setién signed Txiki from Cultural Leonesa. Txiki was an important part of Racing's promotion winning-campaign.

Txiki played 89 league matches in Segunda B with Cultural Leonesa, and 47 league matches in Segunda and La Liga with Racing.

References

External links

1977 births
Living people
Spanish footballers
Footballers from San Sebastián
Association football midfielders
La Liga players
Segunda División players
Segunda División B players
SD Beasain footballers
Cultural Leonesa footballers
Racing de Santander players
Córdoba CF players
CD Castellón footballers
AD Ceuta footballers
Zamora CF footballers